Brep is a village in upper Chitral District, Pakistan. It is located near Sonoghar.

History
A Chinese fort existed there in the 18th century.

About 40 houses in Brep were destroyed in flooding in July 2015.

References

Populated places in Chitral District